Basnayaka Ralalage Ranjith Siyambalapitiya (born 1 May 1961) (known as Ranjith Siyambalapitiya) is a Sri Lankan politician. He is currently serving as Minister of State for Finance, serving with Shehan Semasinghe since 8 September 2022.  He was the  Deputy Speaker and Chairman of Committees of the Parliament of Sri Lanka. He is a member of parliament for the Kegalle District. He had served as the former Cabinet Minister of Telecommunication and Information Technology.

Early life and education
Born to Basnayaka Ralalage Cyril Siyambalapitiya of Kegalle and Rajakumara Atapattu Mudiyanselage Kusumawathi of Wendala, Ruwanwella, he had his education at Ruwanwella Primary School and then at Royal College Colombo. In 1981 he entered to the University of Sri Jayawardanapura and graduated with a Bachelor of Business Administration in 1985.

References

External links
 Biographies of Member of Parliament
 Right Royal rally of old Royalists in the Sri Lanka Parliament

Sri Lankan Buddhists
Alumni of Royal College, Colombo
Members of the 11th Parliament of Sri Lanka
Members of the 12th Parliament of Sri Lanka
Members of the 13th Parliament of Sri Lanka
Members of the 14th Parliament of Sri Lanka
Members of the 15th Parliament of Sri Lanka
Members of the 16th Parliament of Sri Lanka
Living people
1961 births
Power ministers of Sri Lanka
Telecommunication ministers of Sri Lanka
Sinhalese politicians